Richard Lestrange (L'Estrange, Strange) (born before Aug 1517) of Hunstanton and King's Lynn, Norfolk; later of Kilkenny, Ireland, was an English politician.

Family
He was the second son of Sir Thomas le Strange and Anne Vaux, daughter of Nicholas Vaux, 1st Baron Vaux of Harrowden. His brother, Nicholas Lestrange, was also an MP, who represented Castle Rising, Norfolk and King's Lynn. He was related to William FitzWilliam, but their exact connection is unrecorded.

He married Dorothy Astley and they had one son, Thomas. His descendants settled at Castle Strange, county Roscommon.

Career
He was Mayor of Waterford 1581-2 and 1588-9. He was a Member (MP) of the Parliament of England for Horsham in 1559 and for King's Lynn in 1563. He was an early supporter of the rights of Mary I of England.

He probably secured election through his brother Nicholas, who was Chamberlain to the Duke of Norfolk; both Horsham and King's Lynn were controlled by the Duke.

References

Year of death missing
English MPs 1559
English MPs 1563–1567
People from Hunstanton
Mayors of places in Ireland
People from King's Lynn
Year of birth uncertain
Le Strange family